M. E. H. Arif College is a higher secondary school located at Konabari, Gazipur Sadar Upazila, Gazipur District, Bangladesh. It offers 7 years (Play-Class Five) primary education (Under Great Mak Primary School), 5 years secondary education, and 2 years higher secondary education. It has about 4,000 students in this college.

This college is marked as top 10 institution in Primary School Certificate (PSC) Examination, Junior School Certificate (JSC) Examination and Secondary School Certificate (SSC) Examination since last 10 years in Gazipur District. In 2021,9 students got chance into medical College. This college achieved 2nd position in 2014. In 2013, this college also achieved 2nd position in Gazipur district. It also marked as 2nd education institution in Dhaka Board based on  percentage of pass in the year 2007

References

Colleges in Gazipur District
Organisations based in Gazipur